Sunne may refer to:

Sunne, Sweden, a town
Sunne Municipality, a Swedish municipality with its seat in the town
Linn T. Sunne (born 1971), Norwegian children's writer
Sunne, the Old English name for the sun
Sunne, possible Anglo-Saxon sun goddess related to the Norse Sól

See also
Sunnee (born 1996), Thai singer